Captain Underpants and the Attack of the Talking Toilets is an American children's book (taking the form of a novel) by Dav Pilkey, and the second book in the Captain Underpants book series. It was published on February 1, 1999. It marks the first appearance of the Turbo Toilet 2000, the Talking Toilets, and the Incredible Robo-Plunger, as well as George and Harold's nerdy tattletale nemesis Melvin Sneedly.

Plot summary
George and Harold got out of their fourth-grade gym class and found that Jerome Horwitz Elementary School is planning on hosting its second annual Invention Convention, with the prize being the recipient(s) becoming the principal for a day. Upon seeing the poster for it, George and Harold think to themselves what it would be like to be principals for the day, but Mr. Krupp bans George and Harold from the convention this year and puts them in study hall all day, because last year's Invention Convention was ruined by them applying a body heat activating glue made of rubber cement and concentrated orange juice they invented on everyone's seats except their own.

While getting ready to secretly sabotage everyone's inventions after thinking it isn't fair, the two boys run into Melvin Sneedly, who is busy working on his invention, the PATSY 2000, a photocopier that can make a simple two-dimensional image come alive. He claims he practiced with a poodle previously, and he demonstrates by putting in a photo of a mouse; out comes a real one, going on the floor. George and Harold assume Melvin put the real mouse in earlier, but they make a deal in which George and Harold promise to not sabotage Melvin's invention, as long as he doesn't report them. Because of George and Harold's pranks, the convention has to be called off, confusing Mr. Krupp as he knows that he put George and Harold in study hall himself and Melvin then breaks George and Harold's promise and tattles on them.

An infuriated Mr. Krupp puts George and Harold in permanent detention for the rest of the school year, in which they are assigned writing a sentence for two hours after school until the chalkboards are completely full, additionally threatening them with suspension if either of them leaves the classroom for any reason. With each boy using a quick line-writing device, they write all their sentences in three-and-a-half minutes, then they pass the time by making a new Captain Underpants comic: "Captain Underpants and the Attack of the Talking Toilets". They decide to go to the copy machine, but realizing that Mr. Krupp will suspend them if they leave the room, they decide to sneak out without Mr. Krupp catching them. However, the copy machine is surrounded by most of the teachers so they go to the gym and try to use Melvin's machine as they still believe it is a normal copy machine.

The machine creates living talking toilets, meaning that Melvin was right all along, and causing George and Harold to make a run for it. While fleeing, George and Harold are caught red-handed by Mr. Krupp who was walking in the hallway and are officially suspended. The boys try to explain what happened in the gym, but Mr. Krupp refuses to listen and does not care since George and Harold are suspended and orders them to leave the school, much to George and Harold's dismay. All the teachers celebrate (almost treating their punishment like expulsion) with Ms. Anthrope planning to call George and Harold's parents, Ms. Ribble deciding to destroy their desks, and Mr. Meaner, the gym teacher, planning to throw a party in the gym. But Mr. Meaner is promptly eaten by one of the toilets, freeing the others. The teachers run away with Ms. Ribble snapping her fingers at a toilet, making Mr. Krupp turn into Captain Underpants. George and Harold chase him as he jumps out the window and desperately steals several pairs of underwear from clotheslines. He shoots them at the hungry toilets, but in vain, as the toilets eat all his ammunition.

Back at school, the trio finds the other toilets had eaten every teacher in the school. The toilets spot them, causing them to retreat into the school. They stumble upon the school's next lunch, 
creamed chipped beef. They sling the lunch at the group of toilet mouths. Due to the lack of good taste in the school's hot lunches, it causes the toilets to vomit everything they had eaten (including the teachers) out and die. Suddenly, the Turbo Toilet 2000 (the toilets' leader) bursts out of the school and despite Captain Underpants's efforts, the Turbo Toilet 2000 defeats and swallows Captain Underpants whole. The boys sneak back into school and use Melvin's machine to make a super-powered robot called the Incredible Robo-Plunger 2000, which fights and defeats the Turbo Toilet 2000, letting the boys save Mr. Krupp (who turned back to normal due to the toilet water in the Turbo Toilet 2000's mouth). He fears that he will be fired for the mess and damages to the school, but George and Harold offer to fix the damages, as long as Mr. Krupp cancels George and Harold's detentions and suspensions, and allows them to be principals for the day. Mr. Krupp desperately accepts, as he still doesn't want to be fired. George and Harold order the Robo-Plunger to repair the school, and fly off to Uranus with the toilets, never to return as part of the deal. As principals, the boys hold an all-day carnival for the students and an A+ for the day and put the teachers (and Melvin for his tattling) in detention writing sentences. At the end of the day, Mr. Krupp questions how the carnival will be paid for; and the boys reveal they sold his antique walnut desk and all the furniture in the teacher's lounge. Mr. Krupp gets furious, and Miss Anthrope snaps her fingers after the boys, once again turning Mr. Krupp into Captain Underpants.

Comics

Captain Underpants and the Attack of the Talking Toilets
In P.E, a UFO shoots rays at the school, which gives the toilets life to eat everyone at the school(the first victim is the gym teacher). Captain Underpants appears and places plungers in the toilets' mouths, then the toilets' leader, the Turbo Toilet 2000, appears and Captain Underpants gives it a wedgie on a stop sign, from where it's slung at the UFO, causing both to explode, the Talking Toilets to turn back into regular toilets, and the cruel gym teacher escapes, much to the kids' dismay.

The Top Secret Truth About Captain Underpants
George and Harold want everyone to know what happened in The Adventures of Captain Underpants. They make this comic book for everyone to know. The story involves 3 parts. A similar comic with added details appears in every subsequent sequel.

Title change
Early versions of the book say "Another Epic Novel by Dav Pilkey" instead of "The Second Epic Novel by Dav Pilkey".

Characters
Characters who appear in this book are:
 George Beard: One of the students at Jerome Horwitz Elementary School. He is friends with Harold Hutchins.
 Harold Hutchins: In the same school as his friend, George Beard. 
 Mr. Krupp: Jerome Horwitz Elementary School's grumpy principal who despises George and Harold.
 Captain Underpants: A superhero from George and Harold's comics, George and Harold accidentally hypnotize Mr. Krupp into thinking he's Captain Underpants.
 Melvin Sneedly: The school genius, tattletale and George and Harold's nemesis.
 The Incredible Robo-Plunger: A robot who beats up the Turbo Toilet 2000. He is made by the PATSY 2000.   
 Madison Mancini: A student who invented the Automatic Dog-Washer that was ruined by George and Harold. 
 Donny Shoemyer: He invented the Electric Ping-Pong Ball Server which was also ruined by the pranking duo. 
 Freddie Moore: A student who invented the Volcano Detector.
 Ms. Ribble: The English teacher of Jerome Horwitz Elementary School.
 Miss Anthrope: The school secretary.
 Mr. Meaner: The gym teacher at Jerome Horwitz Elementary School.
 The Talking Toilets and the Turbo Toilet 2000: The villains of the book. The Turbo Toilet 2000 returns on his own in the eleventh book, Captain Underpants and the Tyrannical Retaliation of the Turbo Toilet 2000.

See also
 The Adventures of Captain Underpants, the first Captain Underpants novel that Dav Pilkey made in 1997.
 Captain Underpants and the Invasion of the Incredibly Naughty Cafeteria Ladies from Outer Space (and the Subsequent Assault of the Equally-Evil Lunchroom Zombie Nerds), the book that follows this one.    
Children's literature
Dav Pilkey
Captain Underpants, the series Dav Pilkey made.
 Captain Underpants and the Tyrannical Retaliation of the Turbo Toilet 2000

References 

1998 American novels
Captain Underpants novels
Fiction set on Uranus
Scholastic Corporation books